The Military ranks of Liberia are the military insignia used by the Armed Forces of Liberia. Liberia shares a rank structure similar to that of the United States Armed Forces.

Commissioned officer ranks
The rank insignia of commissioned officers.

Other ranks
The rank insignia of non-commissioned officers and enlisted personnel.

References

External links
 

Liberia
Military of Liberia